Tonight We Sing is a 1953 American musical biopic film directed by Mitchell Leisen and starring David Wayne, Ezio Pinza and Roberta Peters. It is based on the life and career of the celebrated impresario Sol Hurok.

The film is based on the 1946 book Impresario, an autobiography written by Sol Hurok with the help of Ruth Goode, who once served as Hurok's press agent. The film credits Hurok as technical advisor.

Cast
David Wayne as Sol Hurok
Ezio Pinza as Feodor Chaliapin
Roberta Peters as Elsa Valdine
Anne Bancroft as Emma Hurok
Tamara Toumanova as Anna Pavlova
Isaac Stern as Eugène Ysaÿe
Byron Palmer as Gregory Lawrence
Jan Peerce as Gregory Lawrence's singing voice
 Oskar Karlweis as Benjamin Golder
 Mikhail Rasumny as 	Nicolai
 Steven Geray as 	Prager
 Walter Woolf King as 	Gritti
 Lela Bliss as Mrs. Granek
 Harry Hayden as Mr. Granek
 Oscar Beregi as	Dr. Markoff
 Isabel Withers as Emma's Maid
 Dudley Dickerson as Porter 
 George E. Stone as 	Impresario

Music
The film features performances of works from classical composers: Chopin, Gounod, Kreisler, Leoncavallo, Mussorgsky, Puccini, Rubinstein, Saint-Saëns, Sarasate, Verdi and Wieniawski. The film includes opera arias, duets and staged scenes from the operas: Boris Goudonov, Faust, Madama Butterfly, and La Traviata. Tamara Toumanova, in her role as Pavlova, performs in three ballet scenes within the film.

The tenor voice of Jan Peerce is heard in the picture as well as the RCA Victor soundtrack release.

References

External links

1953 films
1953 musical films
20th Century Fox films
American biographical films
American musical films
Biographical films about singers
Films scored by Alfred Newman
Films directed by Mitchell Leisen
Films with screenplays by Harry Kurnitz
Cultural depictions of Russian men
Cultural depictions of classical musicians
1950s English-language films
1950s American films